The 1977–78 in English field hockey.

The Men's Cup was won by Guildford and the inaugural Women's Cup was won by the Chelsea College of Physical Education (Eastbourne) Hockey Club.

The Men's National Inter League Championship brought together the winners of their respective regional leagues. The championship (held in September 1978) was won by Southgate.

As from the 1980–81 season the National Inter League Championship would be held in the spring of the same season instead of the Autumn of the following season.

Men's National Inter League Championship 
(Held at Officers' Club, Aldershot, September 23–24)

Group A

Group B

Final 

Southgate
David Owen, Robert Cattrall, Nigel Woolven, A Wallace, Ian McGinn, Raj Rawal, Michael Corby, Alistair McGinn, Roly Brookeman, James Neale, Imtiaz Sheikh 
Trojans
P Goss, D Legg, A Muller, G Kirkham, K Chambers, G Leach, J Isaacs, G Lucas, A Fernandes, B M Purdy, B Hiscock

Men's Cup (Rank Xerox National Clubs Championship)

Quarter-finals

Semi-finals

Final 
(Held at Guildford Hockey Club on 7 May)

Guildford
R Wright, I Carley, N Taylor, M Read (C Basey sub), Ian Pinks, M Perrin, N Marchington, P Pennock, A Jeans, C Cottrell, B Pett 
Slough
Ian Taylor, Mike Parris, Manjit Flora, Andy Churcher, John Allen, John Murdock, Sutinder Singh Khehar, Ken Partington (Pami Saini sub), Stuart Collins, Balwant Saini, Masood Ahmad

Women's Cup (National Clubs Championship) 
(Liverpool, April 9)

Final

References 

1977
field hockey
field hockey
1977 in field hockey
1978 in field hockey